McCavana is a surname of Irish origin. Notable people with the surname include:

Declan McCavana (born 1963), Northern Irish scholar and professor
Terry McCavana (1922 – 2015), Northern Irish footballer

Surnames of Irish origin